Ischyja ferrifracta is a species of moth of the family Noctuidae first described by Francis Walker in 1864.

Description
As described in The Moths of Borneo, “the pale brown wedge dividing the forewing apex identifies both sexes of this species. The male has a distinctive loop containing leaden-grey on the dorsum at one third that is separated from an 8-shaped patch of a similar grey distal to the reniform by a zone of fawn speckles on black. The ventral constriction of the 8 is produced by a distal tooth from the reniform. The male hindwings are only slightly suffused blue basal to a clearly defined, narrow, pale blue postmedial fascia.” 

It has been recorded from Borneo, Peninsular Malaysia, India, Java, Lombok, Dammer, Thailand (VK), Hainan and Japan.

References 

Catocalinae
Moths of Japan